Beware of Bachelors is a 1928 American part-talkie pre-code comedy drama film produced and released by Warner Bros., and directed by Roy Del Ruth. The movie stars Audrey Ferris, William Collier Jr., Margaret Livingston, Clyde Cook, and George Beranger. The film was based on a short story by Mark Canfield (an alias for Darryl F. Zanuck).

Plot
A young doctor (William Collier Jr.) is accused by his pretty wife (Audrey Ferris) of paying too much attention to one of his woman patients (Margaret Livingston) when she makes a pass at him. Ferris, assuming that her husband is having an affair, decide to have one herself with a perfumer, played by George Beranger. Wife and husband make up but they soon quarrel once again when the jealous wife finds her husband at a cafe with Livingston. Ferris decides to leave her husband and starts going out with Beranger to wild parties. Eventually, Ferris decides that she truly loves Collier and can't live without him. They are reconciled and Ferris returns to her husband.

Cast
 Audrey Ferris as May, the wife
 William Collier Jr. as Ed, the husband
 Clyde Cook as Joe Babbitt
 George Beranger as Claude de Brie
 Dave Morris as Detective
 Margaret Livingston as Miss Pfeffer, the vamp

Preservation status
A 35mm copy of this film survives at the Library of Congress Packard Campus for Audio-Visual Conservation in Washington, D.C., and a 16mm copy survives at the University of Wisconsin at Madison.

References
Notes

External links

1928 films
1920s English-language films
Warner Bros. films
1928 comedy-drama films
American comedy-drama films
American black-and-white films
1920s American films